Muzzarelli is an Italian surname. Notable people with the surname include:

 Adele Muzzarelli (1816–1885), Italian soprano, soubrette and dancer
 Alfonso Muzzarelli (1749–1813), Italian Jesuit theologian and scholar
 Gian Carlo Muzzarelli (born 1955),  Italian politician

Italian-language surnames